The 1942 College Football All-America team is composed of college football players who were selected as All-Americans by various organizations and writers that chose College Football All-America Teams in 1942. The nine selectors recognized by the NCAA as "official" for the 1942 season are (1) Collier's Weekly, as selected by Grantland Rice, (2) the Associated Press, (3) the United Press, (4) the All-America Board, (5) the International News Service (INS), (6) Look magazine, (7) the Newspaper Enterprise Association (NEA), (8) Newsweek, and (9) the Sporting News.

Two individuals were unanimous selections; they were Georgia halfback (and Heisman Trophy winner) Frank Sinkwich and Wisconsin end Dave Schreiner.

Consensus All-Americans
For the year 1942, the NCAA recognizes nine published All-American teams as "official" designations for purposes of its consensus determinations. The following chart identifies the NCAA-recognized consensus All-Americans and displays which first-team designations they received.

All-American selections for 1942

Ends
Dave Schreiner, Wisconsin (College Football Hall of Fame) (AAB; AP-1; CO-1; INS-1; LK-1; NEA-1; NW; SN-1; UP-1; CP-1; NYS-1; WC-1; MS-1; PL)
Bob Dove, Notre Dame (College Football Hall of Fame) (AAB; INS-2; NEA-1; NW; SN-1; UP-1; CP-2; NYS-2; WC-1)
Don Currivan, Boston College (AP-2; UP-2; INS-1; NEA-3; CO-1; NYS-1)
Bob Shaw, Ohio State (AP-1; SN-3; CP-1)
George Poschner, Georgia (AP-2; UP-2; SN-2; CP-3; NEA-2; MS-1)
Bruce Alford, TCU  (AP-3)
Al Hust, Tennessee  (AP-3; INS-2; NEA-2)
Nick Suseoff, Washington State  ( NYS-2)
James Kelleher, Army (SN-3; NEA-3)
Bert Kuczynski, Penn (LK-1)
Pete Pihos, Indiana (PL)
Bob Gantt, Duke (SN-2)
Al Beals, Santa Clara  (CP-2)
Saxon Judd, Tulsa (CP-3)

Tackles
Dick Wildung, Minnesota (College Football Hall of Fame) (AAB; AP-1; CO-1; LK-1; NEA-1; NW; SN-1; UP-1; CP-1; NYS-1; WC-1; MS-1; PL)
Al Wistert, Michigan (College Football Hall of Fame) (AAB; AP-2; LK-1; NEA-3; NW; SN-2; UP-1; CP-3; NYS-1; WC-1; MS-1; PL)
Clyde Johnson, Kentucky (AP-1)
Stan Mauldin, Texas (AP-2; CP-1)
Don Whitmire, Alabama (College Football Hall of Fame) (AP-3; SN-3; NEA-1)
Norm Verry, USC (AP-3)
Derrell Palmer, TCU (SN-3; INS-1; CP-2)
Francis E. Merritt, Army (College Football Hall of Fame) (CP-2; NEA-2)
Al Klug, Marquette (CP-3)
Chuck Csuri, Ohio State (UP-2; SN-2; INS-1; NYS-2)
Gil Bouley, Boston College (UP-2; SN-1; CP-2; NEA-3)
Robin Olds, Army  (CO-1; NYS-2)
Lou Rymkus, Notre Dame ( NEA-2)
Don McCafferty, Ohio State (INS-2)
John Donaldson, Penn (INS-2)

Guards
Harvey Hardy, Georgia Tech (AP-2; INS-1; NEA-1; NW; UP-1; CP-1; NYS-1)
Chuck Taylor, Stanford (College Football Hall of Fame)(AAB; AP-1; LK-1; SN-1; CP-3; NEA-2; WC-1; PL)
Julius Franks, Michigan (AP-2; CO-1; INS-1; NEA-2; NW; SN-3; CP-1; NYS-2)
Merv Pregulman, Michigan (SN-3; NEA-1; MS-1 [4-way tie])
Buster Ramsey, William & Mary (College Football Hall of Fame) (AP-1; SN-2; CP-2; NYS-2; MS-1 [4-way tie])
Jack Lescoulie, UCLA  (AP-3; INS-2)
Lindell Houston, Ohio State  (AAB; AP-3; CO-1; CP-2; UP-2; NEA-3; NYS-1; WC-1; PL)
Alex Agase, Illinois  (College Football Hall of Fame) (LK-1; UP-1; SN-1; INS-2; CP-3; NEA-3; MS-1 [4-way tie])
Harry C. Wright, Notre Dame (SN-2)
George Hecht, Alabama ( MS-1 [4-way tie])
Rocco Canale, Boston College (UP-2)

Centers
Joe Domnanovich, Alabama (AAB; AP-1; CO-1; INS-2; LK-1; NW; SN-1; UP-2; CP-1; NYS-1; WC-1; MS-1; PL)
Spencer Moseley, Yale  (AP-3; UP-1; SN-2; CP-2; NEA-1)
Fred Naumetz, Boston College (SN-3; INS-1; CP-3; NYS-2)
Louis Sossamon, South Carolina (AP-2)
Walt Harrison, Washington (NEA-2)
Buddy Gatewood, Baylor (NEA-3)

Quarterbacks
Paul Governali, Columbia (College Football Hall of Fame) (AAB; AP-1; CO-1; NEA-3; NW; SN-1; UP-1; CP-2; NYS-1; WC-1; PL)
Glenn Dobbs, Tulsa (College Football Hall of Fame) (AP-1; INS-1; NEA-1; NW; SN-2; UP-2; CP-2; NYS-2)
Angelo Bertelli, Notre Dame  (College Football Hall of Fame) (LK-1; SN-2; UP-2; CP-3)
Jesse Freitas, Santa Clara  (AP-3)
Clint Castleberry, Georgia Tech  (AP-3; UP-2; SN-3; INS-2; NEA-2)
Otto Graham, Northwestern (College and Pro Hall of Fame) (SN-3; CP-3)

Halfbacks
Frank Sinkwich, Georgia (College Football Hall of Fame) (AAB; AP-1; CO-1; INS-1; LK-1; NEA-1; NW; SN-1; UP-1; CP-1; NYS-1; WC-1; MS-1; PL)
Billy Hillenbrand, Indiana (AAB; AP-2; UP-1; SN-1; CP-1; NEA-1; CO-1; NYS-1; WC-1)
Monk Gafford, Auburn  (AP-2; INS-1; CP-3; NYS-2; PL)
Bob Steuber, Missouri  (College Football Hall of Fame) (AP-2; SN-1; CP-2; NEA-2; NYS-2; PL)
Bill Daley, Minnesota (SN-3; CP-2; NEA-3; MS-1)
J. T. "Blondy" Black, Mississippi State  (CP-3; NEA-3)
Gene Fekete, Ohio State (SN-3; CP-3)
Jackie Fellows, Fresno State (LK-1; MS-1)
Henry Mazur, Army (INS-2)

Fullbacks
Mike Holovak, Boston College (College Football Hall of Fame) (AP-1; CO-1; LK-1; NEA-1; NW; UP-1; CP-1; NYS-1)
Bob Kennedy, Washington State  (AP-2; INS-1; CP-1)
Pat Harder, Wisconsin (College Football Hall of Fame) (AAB; P-3; UP-2; SN-2; INS-2; NEA-2; NYS-2; WC-1; MS-1)
Joe Muha, VMI  (NEA-3)
Roy McKay, Texas (INS-2)

Key
Bold = Consensus All-American
 1 – First-team selection
 2 – Second-team selection
 3 – Third-team selection

Official selectors
 AAB = All-America Board
 AP = Associated Press
 CO = Collier's Weekly, selected by Grantland Rice
 INS = International News Service 
 LK = NBC radio and Look magazine, selected under the supervision of Bill Stern, by 138 sports announcers and 25 key sports writers
 NEA = Newspaper Enterprise Association
 NW = Newsweek
 SN = Sporting News, selected through a poll of 86 sports writers in 40 states
 UP = United Press

Other selectors
 CP = Central Press Association, selected with the assistance of the nation's football captains
 NYS = New York Sun
 WC = Walter Camp Football Foundation
 MS = Maxwell Stiles, noted California sports writer, based on the number of weeks a player was named player of the week at his position
 PL = All-Players All-America team selected based on ballots cast by 1,706 major college lettermen and announced by Norman Sper, a radio football broadcaster

See also
 1942 All-Big Six Conference football team
 1942 All-Big Ten Conference football team
 1942 All-Pacific Coast Conference football team
 1942 All-SEC football team

References

All-America Team
College Football All-America Teams